Prusmack is a surname. Notable people with the surname include: 

Florence Prusmack (1920–2013), American author
Jon Prusmack (?–2018), American rugby player and businessman